The Fenkel Northern Redsea Challenge is a cycling race held annually in the Northern Red Sea Region, Eritrea since 2013. It was rated 2.2 in 2013 and 1.2 in 2016. The race is part of UCI Africa Tour.

Winners

References

Cycle races in Eritrea
Recurring sporting events established in 2013
UCI Africa Tour races